Bascom Sine Deaver (November 26, 1882 – October 13, 1944) was a United States district judge of the United States District Court for the Middle District of Georgia.

Education and career

Born in Union County, Georgia, Deaver received an Artium Baccalaureus from Mercer University in 1907 and a Bachelor of Laws from Mercer University School of Law in 1910. He was in private practice in Macon, Georgia from 1910 to 1922. He was an Assistant United States Attorney of the Southern District of Georgia from 1922 to 1926, and then was the United States Attorney for the Middle District of Georgia from 1926 to 1928.

Federal judicial service

Deaver was nominated by President Calvin Coolidge on March 5, 1928, to a seat on the United States District Court for the Middle District of Georgia vacated by Judge William Josiah Tilson. He was confirmed by the United States Senate on March 19, 1928, and received his commission the same day. His service terminated on October 13, 1944, due to his death.

References

Sources
 

1882 births
1944 deaths
United States Attorneys for the Middle District of Georgia
Judges of the United States District Court for the Middle District of Georgia
United States district court judges appointed by Calvin Coolidge
20th-century American judges
Assistant United States Attorneys
Mercer University alumni